JTG is an American professional wrestler (born 1984).

JTG may also refer to:
 Jet Time, a defunct Danish airline (ICAO code: JTG)
 John Thomas Griffith (born 1960), American singer-songwriter
 Jordan Telecom Group, a telephone company
 JTG Daugherty Racing, a NASCAR team